Nasimabad (also Romanized as Nasīmābād) is a village in Karvan-e Sofla Rural District, Karvan District, Tiran and Karvan County, Isfahan Province, Iran. At the 2006 census, its population was 819, in 215 families.

References 

Populated places in Tiran and Karvan County